Angeldon, also known as a "tip-up" is a fishing gear that is used in ice fishing. The angeldon consists of a short, bottom laced, wooden rod that is attached in the ice adjacent to a drilled hole. On the stick sits a reel (formerly of wood, now made of plastic), and on that is the angel's rope coiled. At the top of the stick there is a 30-40 cm long leaf spring which react when you got something on. On the top of the leaf spring there is a painted red cork or plastic disc. Some angeldon is additionally equipped with a device that marks when you got something on with sound (percussion cap) or smoke.

Fishing equipment